Ignacio Capllonch (October 1 to 1986)  is the Argentine kickboxer and Muay Thai fighter, who has held World Kickboxing Network Bantamweight world titles in two styles, oriental rules and Full Contact boxing.

Titles
World Kickboxing Network
 2010 WKN K-1 Argentina Champion
 2013 WKN Oriental rules World Bantamweight Champion
 2015 WKN Full Contact World Super Flyweight Champion
 2015 WKN Oriental rules International Featherweight Champion
 2019 WKN Full Contact Continental Champion
World Kickboxing League
 2012 WKL K-1 Argentina Bantamweight Champion
 2017 WKL K-1 World Featherweight Champion
World Kickboxing Federation
 2010 WKF Full Contact Argentina Champion
 2012 WKF Argentina K-1 Featherweight Champion
 2014 WKF K-1 South America Champion
 2019 WKF Full Contact Continental Champion
World Karate & Kickboxing Council
 2011 WKC Continental Champion
 2012 WKC Kickboxing -60 kg Champion
International Sport Kickboxing Association
 2013 ISKA K-1 Argentina Champion
Unión Argentina de Kick Boxing
 2010 UKA Full Contact Argentina Champion
 2015 UKA South America Champion
World Association of Kickboxing Organizations
 2014 WAKO World Cup in Brazil K-1 -57 kg Champion

Fight record

|-  bgcolor="#cfc"
| 2021-03-21 || Win ||align=left| Brian Fernandez || Bosch Tour || Buenos Aires, Argentina || Decision ||  ||

|-  bgcolor="#cfc"
| 2019-11-17 || Win ||align=left| Nicolás Berrutti || Bosch Tour || Buenos Aires, Argentina || Technical Decision (Unanimous)|| 8 || 2:00
|-
! style=background:white colspan=9 |

|-  bgcolor="#cfc"
| 2019-10-13 || Win ||align=left| Ezequiel Urquiza || CHDK Kick Boxing 6º World Championship Open|| Buenos Aires, Argentina || Decision || 3 || 3:00
|-
! style=background:white colspan=9 |

|-  bgcolor="#cfc"
| 2019-07-06 || Win ||align=left| Junior Cristaldo|| Bosch Tour || Buenos Aires, Argentina || Decision (Unanimous)|| 5 || 2:00

|-  bgcolor="#cfc"
| 2019-06-09 || Win ||align=left| Christián Pérez|| Punishers 10 || Buenos Aires, Argentina || Decision (Unanimous)|| 5 || 2:00
|-
! style=background:white colspan=9 |

|-  style="background:#fbb;"
| 2018-11-17|| Loss||align=left| Suakim PK Saenchaimuaythaigym || RISE 129 || Tokyo, Japan || Decision (Unanimous)|| 3 || 3:00
|-
|-  bgcolor="#cfc"
| 2018-09-22 || Win ||align=left| Fabricio Silva || WKN "Simply the Best 22 Buenos Aires" || Buenos Aires, Argentina || Decision (Unanimous)|| 4 || 2:00

|-  bgcolor="#fbb"
| 2018-08-24 || Loss ||align=left| Renzo Martinez || WGP Kickboxing 48 || Buenos Aires, Argentina || Decision (Unanimous)|| 3 || 3:00

|-  style="text-align:center; background:#cfc;"
| 2018-06-10 || Win|| align=left|  || Punishers 9 || Buenos Aires, Argentina || Decision || 5 || 3:00
|-
! style=background:white colspan=9 |

|-  bgcolor="#cfc"
| 2018-05-18 || Win ||align=left| Maiquel Pereira|| WKN "Simply the Best 19 Buenos Aires" || Buenos Aires, Argentina || Decision || 3 || 3:00

|-  style="text-align:center; background:#cfc;"
| 2018-04-14 || Win|| align=left| Carlos Gómez || Bosch Tour || Buenos Aires, Argentina || Decision (Unanimous)|| 5 || 3:00

|-  style="text-align:center; background:#fbb;"
| 2017-12-15|| Loss ||align=left| Hector Santiago || WGP Kickboxing #43 || Buenos Aires, Argentina || KO (Knee to the head) || 4 || 1:10
|-
! style=background:white colspan=9 |

|-  style="text-align:center; background:#fbb;"
| 2017-11-23 || Loss|| align=left| Tenshin Nasukawa || RISE 121  || Tokyo, Japan || TKO (Punches) || 3 || 1:15

|-  style="text-align:center; background:#cfc;"
| 2017-09-15 || Win|| align=left| Takanobu Sano || RISE 119 || Tokyo, Japan || KO (Left hook) || 2 || 1:22

|-  style="text-align:center; background:#cfc;"
| 2017-07-16 || Win|| align=left| Alex Dias || Bosch Tour || Buenos Aires, Argentina || KO (Left body kick) || 1 || 0:35

|-  bgcolor="#CCFFCC"
| 2017-05-14 || Win ||align=left| Marco Dal Jovem || Bosch Tour || Buenos Aires, Argentina || KO (Left body kick)||3 ||3:00
|-
! style=background:white colspan=9 |

|-  style="background:#CCFFCC;"
| 2017-04-07 || Win||align=left| Felipe Bocaz|| WGP Kickboxing 36, Final|| São Paulo, Brazil || KO (Left body kick)|| 2|| 1:35

|-  style="background:#CCFFCC;"
| 2017-04-07 || Win||align=left| Ricardo Koreano|| WGP Kickboxing 36, Semi Final|| São Paulo, Brazil || Decision (Unanimous)|| 3|| 3:00

|-  style="text-align:center; background:#cfc;"
| 2016-11-13 || Win|| align=left| Bruno Caique || The Best Fighters || Buenos Aires, Argentina || Decision (Unanimous) || 3 || 3:00

|-  style="background:#CCFFCC;"
| 2016-09-10 || Win||align=left| Jonathan Leuch || WGP Kickboxing 33|| São Paulo, Brazil || KO (Overhand right)|| 1||

|-  bgcolor="#CCFFCC"
| 2016-07-31 || Win ||align=left| Ezequiel Urquiza || Bosch Tour || Buenos Aires, Argentina || Decision ||3 ||3:00

|-  style="text-align:center; background:#cfc;"
| 2016-05-08 || Win|| align=left| Bruno Deminski || The Best Fighters 2|| Buenos Aires, Argentina || KO (Left body kick) || 1 ||

|-  style="text-align:center; background:#cfc;"
| 2016-03-25 || Win|| align=left| Ariel Villalba || Bosch Tour || Buenos Aires, Argentina || KO (Left body kick) || 1 || 2:10

|-  style="text-align:center; background:#cfc;"
| 2015-11-08 || Win|| align=left| Leonardo Daldegan||  || José C. Paz, Argentina || KO (Right cross) || 4 || 
|-
! style=background:white colspan=9 |

|-  style="text-align:center; background:#cfc;"
| 2015-10-09 || Win|| align=left| Alexandre Silva || WKN "Simply the Best 7 Caseros" || Caseros, Buenos Aires, Argentina || KO (Punch) || 1 || 
|-
! style=background:white colspan=9 |

|-  style="text-align:center; background:#cfc;"
| 2015-06-13 || Win|| align=left| Jerome Ardissone ||  || Nice, France || TKO (Doctor stoppage)|| 6 || 
|-
! style=background:white colspan=9 |

|-  style="text-align:center; background:#cfc;"
| 2015-05-18 || Win|| align=left| Cesar Benitez || Punishers || Lanus, Argentina || Decision (Unanimous) || 5 || 3:00

|-  style="text-align:center; background:#fbb;"
| 2015-02-28 || Loss || align=left| German Baltazar || WCK at Casino Morongo || Los Angeles, California United States || Decision (Majority)|| 3 || 3:00

|-  style="text-align:center; background:#cfc;"
| 2014-12-19 || Win|| align=left| Cesar Benitez || WKN Simply the Best 2 Caseros || Caseros, Buenos Aires, Argentina || TKO (Right cross) || 3 || 1:25

|-  bgcolor="#fbb"
| 2014-09-27 || Loss||align=left| Paulo Tebar || WGP Kickboxing 22, Final || São Paulo, Brazil || KO (High kick)|| 2 || 2:15
|-
! style=background:white colspan=9 |

|-  bgcolor="#CCFFCC"
| 2014-09-27 || Win ||align=left| Rafael Araujo || WGP Kickboxing 22, Semi Final || São Paulo, Brazil || Decision (Unanimous)|| 3 || 3:00

|-  bgcolor="#CCFFCC"
| 2014-06-06 || Win ||align=left| Ezequiel Urquiza ||  || Buenos Aires, Argentina || KO (High kick)|| 2 ||1:30

|-  bgcolor="#CCFFCC"
| 2014-05-18 || Win ||align=left| Thiago Silva ||  || Buenos Aires, Argentina || KO (Right cross)|| 1 || 
|-
! style=background:white colspan=9 |

|-  bgcolor="#CCFFCC"
| 2014-04-11 || Win ||align=left| Maximiliano Luna ||  || Argentina || Decision (Majority)|| 3 || 3:00

|-  style="text-align:center; background:#cfc;"
| 2013-12-06 || Win|| align=left| Javier Cochea Garay || || Argentina || KO (Left body kick) || 1 ||

|-  style="text-align:center; background:#cfc;"
| 2013-10-04 || Win|| align=left| Cledison Pereira || WKN Kickboxing|| Argentina || KO (Knee to the head) || 2 || 
|-
! style=background:white colspan=9 |

|-  style="text-align:center; background:#cfc;"
| 2013-09-13 || Win|| align=left| Gaston Gomez || Norte vs Sur|| Buenos Aires, Argentina || KO (Low kicks) || 3 ||

|-  bgcolor="#CCFFCC"
| 2013-08-23 || Win ||align=left| Lautaro Domenichelli || || Caseros, Buenos Aires, Argentina || Decision|| 3 ||3:00 
|-
! style=background:white colspan=9 |

|-  style="text-align:center; background:#cfc;"
| 2013-07-14 || Win|| align=left| Lucas Pereira || Club Liniers|| Buenos Aires, Argentina || TKO (Corner stoppage/Low kicks) || 2 ||

|-  style="text-align:center; background:#cfc;"
| 2013-06-14 || Win|| align=left| Eduardo Vieira || || Buenos Aires, Argentina || TKO (Jump spinning back kick) || 1 ||

|-  bgcolor="#CCFFCC"
| 2013-05-12 || Win ||align=left| Christian Nieto || Club Liniers || Buenos Aires, Argentina || KO (Punches)||1 ||
|-
! style=background:white colspan=9 |

|-  bgcolor="#CCFFCC"
| 2013-03-09 || Win ||align=left| Ariel Delgado || || Argentina || Decision||3 ||3:00

|-  bgcolor="#CCFFCC"
| 2012-12-14 || Win ||align=left| Gonzalo Diaz||  || San Salvador de Jujuy, Argentina || Decision (Unanimous)||3||2:00

|-  bgcolor="#CCFFCC"
| 2012-10-27 || Win ||align=left| Enzo Nahuel||  || Buenos Aires, Argentina || Decision (Unanimous)||3||3:00

|-  bgcolor="#CCFFCC"
| 2012-09-14 || Win ||align=left| Gonzalo Diaz||  || San Salvador de Jujuy, Argentina || Decision (Unanimous)||3||2:00

|-  bgcolor="#CCFFCC"
| 2012-08-25 || Win ||align=left| Enzo Nahuel ||  || Bahía Blanca, Argentina || Decision||3||3:00
|-
! style=background:white colspan=9 |

|-  bgcolor="#CCFFCC"
| 2012-08-10 || Win ||align=left| Gaston Gomez||  || San Francisco, Córdoba, Argentina || KO (Low kick)||2||

|-  bgcolor="#CCFFCC"
| 2012-06-29 || Win ||align=left| Miguel Canido|| La Última Batalla, Final || Santa Cruz de la Sierra, Bolivia || Decision (Majority)||3||3:00

|-  bgcolor="#CCFFCC"
| 2012-06-29 || Win ||align=left| Mauricio Guevara|| La Última Batalla, Semi Final || Santa Cruz de la Sierra, Bolivia || Decision (Unanimous)||3||3:00

|-  bgcolor="#CCFFCC"
| 2012-06-10 || Win ||align=left| Christian Nieto|| Club Liniers || Buenos Aires, Argentina || Decision (Unanimous)||4||3:00 
|-
! style=background:white colspan=9 |

|-  style="text-align:center; background:#cfc;"
| 2012-05-19 || Win|| align=left| Romel Gutierrez || FIGHTER || Buenos Aires, Argentina || TKO (Low kicks) || 2 || 3:00
|-
! style=background:white colspan=9 |

|-  bgcolor="#CCFFCC"
| 2012-04-01 || Win ||align=left| Juan Da Silva || Club de la Pelea || Argentina || KO (Punches)||2 ||

|-  bgcolor="#CCFFCC"
| 2011-12-16 || Win ||align=left| Cesar Romero || WGP Kickboxing 22, Semi Final || Argentina || TKO (Punches & kicks)|| 2 || 0:20

|-  bgcolor="#CCFFCC"
| 2011-11-13 || Win ||align=left| Lautaro Domenichelli || PUNISHERS || Argentina || TKO (Knees)|| 2 || 
|-
! style=background:white colspan=9 |

|-  style="text-align:center; background:#cfc;"
| 2011-10-15 || Win|| align=left| Gaston Gomez || || Río Gallegos, Argentina || KO (Low kick) || 1 ||

|-  bgcolor="#CCFFCC"
| 2011-09-18 || Win ||align=left| Sebastian Calvo || || Argentina || Decision||3 ||3:00

|-  bgcolor="#CCFFCC"
| 2011-08-27 || Win ||align=left| Leonel Carreras || || San Francisco, Córdoba, Argentina || KO (Low kicks)||2 ||
|-
! style=background:white colspan=9 |

|-  bgcolor="#CCFFCC"
| 2011-08-13 || Win ||align=left| Ariel Arias || || Argentina || Decision (Unanimous)||3 ||2:00

|-  bgcolor="#CCFFCC"
| 2011-07-15 || Win ||align=left| Joaquin Ibanez || || Argentina || TKO (Low kicks)||2 ||
|-
! style=background:white colspan=9 |

|-  bgcolor="#CCFFCC"
| 2011-05-29 || Win ||align=left| Gerardo Dos Santos || Club Pedro Echague|| Buenos Aires, Argentina || Decision ||3 ||3:00

|-  bgcolor="#CCFFCC"
| 2011-05-15 || Win ||align=left| Valdair Branco || || Argentina || KO (Left hook to the body)||1||

|-  bgcolor="#CCFFCC"
| 2011-04-09 || Win ||align=left| Roberto Fernandez || || Río Gallegos, Argentina || KO (High kick)||1||

|-  bgcolor="#CCFFCC"
| 2010-12-19 || Win ||align=left| Marcelo Mendieta || Club Argentino De Castelar|| Castelar, Argentina || Decision||5||3:00 
|-
! style=background:white colspan=9 |

|-  bgcolor="#CCFFCC"
| 2010-11-20 || Win ||align=left| Marcelo Mendieta || Club Argentino De Castelar|| Buenos Aires, Argentina || KO (High kick)||1|| 
|-
! style=background:white colspan=9 |

|-  bgcolor="#CCFFCC"
| 2010-10-31 || Win ||align=left| Dario Coria || || Castelar, Argentina || Decision||||
|-
! style=background:white colspan=9 |

|-  bgcolor="#CCFFCC"
| 2010-10-08 || Win ||align=left| Roberto Fernandez || || Córdoba, Argentina || KO (Low kick)|| 1||

|-  bgcolor="#CCFFCC"
| 2010-07-18 || Win ||align=left| Dario Coria || || Argentina || Decision||3||3:00

|-  bgcolor="#CCFFCC"
| 2010-06-04 || Win ||align=left| Gonzalo Cortabarria || || Cordoba, Argentina || TKO (Corner stoppage)||1||

|-  bgcolor="#CCFFCC"
| 2010-05-16 || Win ||align=left| Edmilson Pereira|| Club Platense|| Argentina || TKO||3||

|-  bgcolor="#CCFFCC"
| 2010-05-08 || Win ||align=left| Luis Arandia|| || José C. Paz, Argentina || TKO (Doctor stoppage)||1||

|-  bgcolor="#CCFFCC"
| 2010-04-19 || Win ||align=left| Nahuel Arias || Warriors || Argentina || Decision||3||3:00

|-  bgcolor="#CCFFCC"
| 2010-03- || Win ||align=left| Maxi Pereira || || Argentina || KO (High kick)||1||

|-  bgcolor="#CCFFCC"
| 2010-02-14 || Win ||align=left| Federico Devesa|| || Argentina || Decision|||| 
|-
! style=background:white colspan=9 |

|-  bgcolor="#CCFFCC"
| 2010-01-23 || Win ||align=left| Jorge Fojo ||KICKBOXING W.K.N. || Miramar, Buenos Aires, Argentina || KO (Low kick)|| 3 ||

|-
| colspan=9 | Legend:    

|-  bgcolor="#CCFFCC"
| 2014-08-17 || Win ||align=left| Claudio Dalla Rosa || 2014 WAKO World Cup in Brazil, Final|| São Paulo, Brazil || Decision||3||3:00 
|-
! style=background:white colspan=9 |

|-  bgcolor="#CCFFCC"
| 2014-08-17 || Win ||align=left| Daniel Mattos || 2014 WAKO World Cup in Brazil, Semi Final|| São Paulo, Brazil || Decision||3||3:00 
|-
| colspan=9 | Legend:

References

1985 births
Living people
Argentine male boxers
Argentine male kickboxers
Bantamweight kickboxers
Featherweight kickboxers
Flyweight kickboxers
Argentine Muay Thai practitioners
Sportspeople from Buenos Aires
Argentine male taekwondo practitioners